Isa Magometovich Markhiyev (born 9 May 1971) is a Russian professional football coach and a former player who currently works as an assistant coach for FC Angusht Nazran.

Club career
He made his Russian Football National League debut for FC Erzu Grozny on 3 April 1993 in a game against FC Druzhba Maykop. He played one more season in the FNL for FC Angusht Nazran.

Honours
 Russian Third League Zone 1 top scorer: 1995 (21 goals).
 Russian Second Division Zone South top scorer: 1999 (34 goals).

External links
 

1971 births
Living people
Russian footballers
Association football forwards
Association football midfielders
FC Zhemchuzhina Sochi players
FC Angusht Nazran players
Russian football managers